Athanasis Karanikolas (born 5 May 1972) is a retired Greek football midfielder.

References

1972 births
Living people
Greek footballers
Apollon Smyrnis F.C. players
Panegialios F.C. players
Super League Greece players
Association football midfielders